Jaihind is a 1994 Indian Tamil-language action war film written and directed by Arjun. The film stars him and Ranjitha. It was released on 20 May 1994 and was a blockbuster at the box office. A spiritual successor titled Jaihind 2, also starring Arjun, was released in 2014.

Premise 
ACP Bharath and his colleague Inspector Priya, along with some prisoners, heads to an island to nab a terrorist group, which are responsible for the deaths of Tamil Nadu's current Chief Minister and Bharath's brother Sriram.

Cast 

Arjun as ACP Bharath IPS
Ranjitha as Inspector Priya
Goundamani as Head Constable Kottaisamy
Manorama as Bharath's mother
Senthil as Pulikutty/Poonaikutty/Paayuson/Swimmer/Saarayakadai Saathappan/Sangili Karuppan/Poonai Padai Thalaivan (He is actually DIG)
Major Sundarrajan as Ravichandran
Kalyan Kumar as Chief Minister
Devan as Sriram, Bharath's brother
Rajesh as Seenivasan
Pandari Bai as Maria Devi
Chandrasekhar as Sekhar
Vaishnavi as Susila
Charuhasan as Priya's father
Chokkalinga Bhagavathar
Idichapuli Selvaraj as Police constable
Vimalraj as the terrorist leader
Bayilvan Ranganathan as Inspector
Gowtham as Gowtham
Kamala Kamesh
Baby Vichitra
Kavithasri as an item number
Raju Sundaram special appearance in the song "Bodhai Yeri Pocchu"

Production
The film was produced on a budget of 3 crores.

Soundtrack 
The music was composed by Vidyasagar, with lyrics written by Vairamuthu.

Reception 
K. Vijiyan of New Straits Times wrote, "The strong family theme helps prop up all the action scenes and makes it different from just another Rambo-style movie." R. P. R. of Kalki wrote that Arjun has done an "one man show like Seshan" however felt that Arjun has messed up in aspects like music calling it torture, keeping lengthy dialogues and the poor choice of actor as antagonist. He concluded that one must appreciate the makers the fact that they've made a point. We have to sigh at the fact that they don't know how to convey it.

References

External links 
 

1990s Tamil-language films
1994 films
Fictional portrayals of the Tamil Nadu Police
Films about terrorism in India
Films directed by Arjun Sarja
Films scored by Vidyasagar
Indian action war films
1990s action war films